Koyaga viriditincta is a species of moth of the family Noctuidae first described by Wileman in 1915. It is found in Taiwan.

The length of the forewings is 11 mm. The forewings are olive brown tinged with white. The hindwings are white slightly sprinkled with pale brown.

References

Moths described in 1915
Acontiinae